WPXK-TV (channel 54) is a television station licensed to Jellico, Tennessee, United States, broadcasting the Ion Television network to the Knoxville area. Owned and operated by the Ion Media subsidiary of the E. W. Scripps Company, the station has offices on Executive Park Drive in west Knoxville, and its transmitter is located on Sharp's Ridge in North Knoxville. Despite Jellico being WPXK-TV's city of license, the station maintains no physical presence there.

Technical information

Subchannels
The station's digital signal is multiplexed:

Analog-to-digital conversion
WPXK-TV shut down its analog signal, over UHF channel 54, on June 12, 2009, the official date in which full-power television stations in the United States transitioned from analog to digital broadcasts under federal mandate. The station's digital signal remained on its pre-transition UHF channel 23. Through the use of PSIP, digital television receivers display the station's virtual channel as its former UHF analog channel 54, which was among the high band UHF channels (52-69) that were removed from broadcasting use as a result of the transition.

References

External links

PXK-TV
E. W. Scripps Company television stations
Ion Television affiliates
Court TV affiliates
Laff (TV network) affiliates
Ion Mystery affiliates
Scripps News affiliates
TrueReal affiliates
Television channels and stations established in 1993
1993 establishments in Tennessee